

Artists 
The following lists musical artists whose discography prominently features dystopian themes.
 Rock band Big Black with their stark portrayals of the underside of American culture.

Albums 
The following lists albums that prominently feature dystopian themes.
 2112, an album by the Canadian rock band Rush, released in 1976. The title track is about a man living in a dystopian society.
 The ArchAndroid by Janelle Monáe.
 Diamond Dogs an album by David Bowie is loosely based on George Orwell's Nineteen Eighty-Four especially the songs "Future Legend", "We Are The Dead", "1984" and "Big Brother".
 Deltron 3030 by Deltron 3030 (Del the Funky Homosapien, Dan the Automator, and Kid Koala), is a hip hop album about a future world of battle raps with aliens, government oppression, and space travel.
 Funkentelechy vs. the Placebo Syndrome by Parliament.
 In the Court of the Crimson King by King Crimson.
 Joe's Garage, a dystopian concept album by Frank Zappa, set in a world where music is illegal and crimes are punished preemptively.
 Kid A by Radiohead.
 Replicas by Gary Numan.
 Year Zero (2007) by Nine Inch Nails is a concept album with a strong dystopian theme and an accompanying alternate reality game.
 The Body, The Blood, The Machine, an album by The Thermals.

Songs 
 "1999" by Prince.
 "Idioteque" by Radiohead.
 "Karn Evil 9" by Emerson, Lake & Palmer.
 "The Apocalypse Song" by St. Vincent.
 "Talkin' World War III Blues" by Bob Dylan.
 "Testify" by Rage Against the Machine.

References 

Dystopian music